James Henry Comley (1835 England–1902 Lexington, Massachusetts) was an American pioneer in horticultural science. 

Born in England on May 29, 1835, Comley moved to Massachusetts in 1854. His work in agriculture, horticulture, and floriculture is documented in over 200 journals for the Massachusetts Horticultural Society, of which Comley was a member.  American Florists Weekly magazine recognized Comley's contributions and awarded him the American Florist Pioneer in 1895. 

Comley's work involvrf the year-round cultivation of plants and vegetation in hothouses and greenhouses and research into soil, potting, and irrigation.

James Henry Comley died on February 1, 1902, in Lexington, Massachusetts.

References

Further reading
Anon (September 6, 1902). "In Memory of James Comley", Transactions of the Massachusetts Horticultural Society, Part I, 125 (extract)
John E. Fogelberg (July 8, 1980). "Burlington Past and Present", The Daily Times and Chronicle (extract)

American horticulturists
British horticulturists
1835 births
1902 deaths